Pilsworth is an area in the Metropolitan Borough of Bury, Greater Manchester, England. Historically, it was a township, but in 1894 it was divided between Bury, Heywood, and Unsworth.

It was formerly home to a retail and leisure complex called Park 66, consisting of a cinema, a ten-pin bowling alley, an Asda superstore and a selection of food outlets including Pizza Hut, McDonald's, Frankie & Benny's and Chiquito. Following the closure of the cinema most of the other retail and leisure venues followed suit with only Asda and McDonald's remaining.

In June 2016 work started on a multi-million pound re-development. This will see Home Bargains, The Food Warehouse, Costa Coffee and KFC open their doors for trading in 2019. A further 8,790 sq ft of retail space will also be made available in unit sizes from 1,250 sq ft. The work is being carried out by Sladen Estates and Peveril Securities.

See also 
 Broadfield railway station

References

External links 
First air compression electricity storage at landfill site.

County history with description of Pilsworth in 1911.

Geography of the Metropolitan Borough of Bury
Areas of Greater Manchester
Former civil parishes in Greater Manchester